Sutton Common BT Tower is a 72-metre (238-foot) radio tower built of reinforced concrete at Macclesfield, Cheshire, England. Sutton Common was originally conceived as part of the 1950s 'Backbone' chain designed to provide the UK and NATO with survivable communications during nuclear war.

The tower stands near the summit of Croker Hill on the western edge of the Peak District national park. Sutton relays signals to Heaton Park in the north and Pye Green to the south. For survivability during a nuclear war, the Backbone towers are some of the few communication towers in the United Kingdom built of reinforced concrete. 

A wind farm was proposed on land adjacent to the transmitter but was objected to for various reasons, including the possible effects of turbine blades on the fixed link.

Channels available from this site

Analogue radio

Digital radio

See also
British Telecom microwave network
Telecommunications towers in the United Kingdom
List of towers

References

External links

Sutton Common's entry at mb21

Buildings and structures in Cheshire
Transmitter sites in England
British Telecom buildings and structures
1960s establishments in England